Dalek War is a Big Finish Productions audio drama series based on the long-running British science fiction television series Doctor Who.

Plot
Dalek War follows the events of Project Infinity, in which the Daleks find themselves at war with a race of seemingly peace-loving Daleks from another universe.  Led by The Mentor, these Daleks ally themselves with the humans against the "Enemy Daleks" of our universe.  Nevertheless, Kalendorf almost immediately suspects his new allies of being as sinister as the Daleks of his own universe. Desperately, he forms a plan, one that may rid the galaxy of both Daleks.

Cast
Kalendorf - Gareth Thomas
Siy Tarkov - Steven Elder
Saloran Hardew - Karen Henson
Marber/Drudger/Sparks - Ian Brooker
Mirana - Teresa Gallagher
Alby Brook - Mark McDonnell
The Mentor - Hannah Smith
Dr Johnstone - Simon Bridge
Herrick/Trooper #1/Vaarga Man - Jeremy James
Susan Mendes - Sarah Mowatt
Morli - Dannie Carr
The Daleks - Nicholas Briggs
Scientist - Simon Bridge
Allenby - Mark Donovan
Trooper #2 - David Sax
Godwin - Helen Goldwyn
Command/Computer/Technician - Jack Galagher

Dalek War
Audio plays by Nicholas Briggs